Anastasiia Nedobiga (born April 20, 1994, in Luhansk) is a Ukrainian diver.

She finished 18th in the 3 metre springboard event of the 2016 Olympic Games. She won her first medal at 2017 European Diving Championships in home Kyiv.

References

1994 births
Living people
Sportspeople from Luhansk
Ukrainian female divers
Divers at the 2016 Summer Olympics
Olympic divers of Ukraine
Universiade medalists in diving
Universiade gold medalists for Ukraine
Medalists at the 2017 Summer Universiade
21st-century Ukrainian women